Andhra Mahabharatham   is the Telugu version of Mahabharatha written by the Kavitrayam (Trinity of poets), consisting of Nannayya, Thikkana and Yerrapragada (also known as Errana).The three poets translated the Mahabharata from Sanskrit into Telugu over the period of the 11–14th centuries CE, and became the idols for all the following poets. More than calling "Andhra Mahabharatham" as a translation of Sanskrit Mahabharatha written by Lord Ganesha under the supervision of Veda Vyasa, this Andhra Mahabharatham was an independent translation. Thus, this translation is not a stanza by stanza translation. These three poets wrote Andhra Mahabharatham in Telugu literature style, but keeping the same exact essence as that of Sanskrit Mahabharatham

Adikavyam in Telugu

There are many doubts about whether Mahabharata is the first work of poetry started by Nannaya in Telugu.  Literary historians are of the opinion that all the mature poetry does not emerge at once, so there must have been some poems before that.  However, no other writings have been found, except for references to songs and poems (Nannechodudu) and some verses found in inscriptions.  So Nannaya was adored by the world of Telugu literature as the original poet.  Prajnannaya Yugam Dwadasi Nageswara Sastry writes this in concluding the chapter - "On the whole Telugu language literature existed before Nannaya. Oral literature was more prevalent. Edictal poetry was in use. Telugu language was good in public affairs. But scriptural language could not have been created. Conditions were suitable for such creation.  No. It could be the reason for that is the familiarity with Sanskrit Prakrits.
Rajaraja Narendra (1019–1061 AD)

Kavithrayam at work
Nannaya wrote Adi Parvam ,Sabaparvam and a part of Aranyaparvam between 1054-1061 and passed away.  Later in the 13th century Tikkana left the remainder of Aranyaparvam and wrote 15 parvams from Virata Parvam to Svargarohana Parvam.  After that in the 14th century Errana Aranyaparva filled the remainder.  Thus these three poets of the age became worshiped by the Telugu poets under the name kavitrayam.  In this way, telugu people is fortunate to be able to read mahabharatham written 
by three poets over a period of two and a half centuries simultaneously but it's looks a single mahakavi was written in at a time.  The Sanskrit Mahabharata is famous for being a book of 100 parvals and having a breadth of 100,000 verses.  Parvanukramanika told by Nannaya in Adi Parvam is also close to this point.  There are hundred of main parvas and subparvas together.  In it Harivamsa Parvam is included in Bhavishya Parvam.  Together these two are considered as an independent text called Khilavansa Purana.  Nannaya does not include the Harivamsa in his genealogy.  He arranges hundred parvas in his Ashtadasa Parva Vibhaktam.  Upaparva section is not followed in Telugu.  The Tikkanadus followed Nannaya's decision. Errana wrote the Harivamsa as a separate treatise.  In this way, the Sanskrit Mahabharata of 100 subparvals was transformed into the Andhra Mahabharata of eighteen parvals in Telugu.  It is divided into Asvasas in Telugu. The division can be seen in the following table.  G.V.  Published in 15 volumes as Kavitrayam Mahabharatam project - edited by Subrahmanyam.  - 2008 Publication</ref>

Nannaya — the Adi Kavi (the first poet) 

Nannayabhatta (1022–1063 CE – also referred to as Nannaya), started to translate the Sanskrit Mahabharata into Telugu on the request of the East Chalukya king Rajaraja Narendra. This marks the beginning of Telugu literature, which has yet been uncovered. This work has been interpreted in the Champu style and emotes such simplicity and polishing and of such high literary excellence, that several scholars do not dismiss the possibility of the existence of literary works in Telugu during the pre-Nannaya period.

Tikkana
Tikkana (or Tikkana Somayaji) (1205–1288) was a 13th century Telugu poet. Born into a Telugu-speaking Niyogi Brahmin family. He was the second poet of the "Trinity of Poets (Kavi Trayam)" that translated Mahabharata into Telugu. Nannaya Bhattaraka, the first, translated two and a half chapters of Mahabharata. Tikkana translated the final 15 chapters, but did not undertake translating the half-finished Aranya Parvamu. The Telugu people remained without this last translation for more than a century, until it was translated by Errana.

Yerrana
Yarrapragada Erranna  was a Telugu poet in the court of King Prolaya Vema Reddy (1325–1353). The surname of Erranna was Yerrapragada or Yerrana, which are epithets of the fair-skinned Lord Skanda in the Telugu language, but became attached to his paternal family due its having notable members with fair or red-skinned complexions. He was honoured with the title Prabandha-paramēśvara ("Master of historical anecdotes") and Śambhudāsuḍu ("Servant of Lord Śiva").
The Sanskrit Mahabharata was translated into Telugu over a period of several centuries (from the 11th to 14th centuries CE). Erranna was one of the kavitrayam ("Trinity of Poets") who rendered the Mahabharatam from Sanskrit into Telugu. The other two poets were Nannaya and Tikkana of the Andhra Mahabharatam ("Andhra Mahabharat"). Tikkana translated the remaining books starting from the 4th, leaving the third book titled the Aranya Parvamu ("Book of the Forest") half-finished, for Erranna to complete. Tikkana did not touch this part because it was considered to be inauspicious to translate this book, which was left half-finished by Nannaya. Erranna started the remaining half of the Aranya Parvamu with the style of Nannaya and ended it with the style of Tikkana as a bridge between the parts translated by Nannaya and Tikkana. Just like Nannaya and Tikkanna, he used half Sanskrit and half Telugu in his Telugu translation of the Sanskrit Mahabharata. He translated the Harivamsamu and Ramayanamu from Sanskrit, dedicating both works to the founder of the Reddy Dynasty, King Prolaya Vemareddy.

Nrusimhapuranamu was his own independent work. Erranna received his inspiration for the Nrusimhapuranam from his grandfather Errapotanna. According to tradition, one day when Erranna was meditating, his grandfather appeared and advised him to write the Narisimhapuranamu. This work was based on the Brahmandapuranamu and the Vishnupuranamu.

According to the Viṣṇu Purāṇa, King Hiraṇyakaśipu was the powerful demonic sovereign of the Earth millions of year ago at the beginning of the Yuga Cycle. The subjects of the Earth were described as Manavas ("descendants of Manu"; "humans"). The subjects of King Indra were described as Devatas. King Hiraṇyakaśipu fought a war with King Indra and, having emerged victorious, took over the heavenly planets. Under the rule of King Hiraṇyakaśipu, most of the Devatas either "converted to" or disguised themselves as Manavas for the fear of King Hiraṇyakaśipu. Another contemporary of King Hiraṇyakaśipu was also gate keeper of Śvetadvīpa, the Vaikuṇṭha planet in this universe, in a previous life, Śrī-hari who ruled in the Kṣīra-sāgara (the "Sea of Milk").

See also

References

Telugu-language literature
Works based on the Mahabharata